Daung (born Thuya Aung; 30 March 1990) is a Burmese film and television actor and former footballer. He first gained widespread fame in Myanmar through his role in the 2019 film The Only Mom. Daung is known for his method acting performances, in contrast to the more typical melodramatic forms of acting popular in Burmese cinema.

Early life
Daung was born on 30 March 1990 in Minhla, Pyay District, Bago Division, Burma. He is the 4th son of 5 siblings. He moved to Mandalay in the second grade.

Club career

Southern Myanmar F.C
Daung moved to Yangon to pursue a singing career, and subsequently signed a 3-year contract in 2010 to play for Southern Myanmar F.C. as a striker.

Career

2015–2017: Acting debut and recognition
Daung made his acting debut with a leading role in the film The Second Heart in 2015, after being selected by Satori Creative Works, a film production company, from among almost 500 amateur actors. He then starred a male lead in the film Little Umbrella Story alongside Paing Phyo Thu in 2017. The film was both a domestic hit in Myanmar, and led to increased recognition for Daung.

In 2017, he gain increased attention and popularity with his role as Maung Maung Gyi in the television series Bagan Myo Thu alongside May Myint Mo and Htoo Aung, aired on MRTV-4 on 28 November 2018 which was a huge commercial success, topping television ratings and becoming the most watched Burmese television drama at that time.

2018–present: Breaking into the big screen and success
In 2018, he took on his first big-screen leading role in the horror-thriller film The Only Mom, alongside actress Wutt Hmone Shwe Yi and actor Nine Nine, directed by Chatchai Katenut, which premiered in Myanmar cinemas on 8 February 2019 stayed in local theaters for a record seven weeks and was also screened in 13 other nations.

The same year, he portrayed the male lead in the big-screen film Wind up Dancer, directed by Myo Myint Shwe, and written by Nat Khat Ni. It was produced by JATAKA Film Production and premiered in Myanmar cinemas on 9 May 2019. And then, he starred in the television series Longing with Love where he played the leading role with Paing Phyo Thu and Angel Lamung, aired by Kamayut Media. After this film, he starred in the epic drama film Legend of the Rain alongside Wutt Hmone Shwe Yi, Ye Deight and Shwe Htoo, directed by Win Lwin Htet which screened in Myanmar cinemas on 11 July 2019 and processed huge hit and successes.

In 2020, he became the ambassador for the Doh Gabar campaign, an environmental awareness campaign, alongside actresses Swe Zin Htaik and Aye Wutyi Thaung. In addition, in 2022, he was also cast in the Thailand drama series "From Chao Phraya to Irrawaddy" directed by Chatchai Katenut and produced by Thai PBS.

Political activities

Following the 2021 Myanmar coup d'état, he participated in the anti-coup movement both in person at rallies and through social media. Denouncing the military coup, he took part in protests, starting in February. He joined the "We Want Justice" three-finger salute movement. The movement was launched on social media, and many celebrities have joined the movement.

On 12 April 2021, warrants for his arrest were issued under Section 505 (a) of the Myanmar Penal Code by the State Administration Council for speaking out against the military coup. Along with several other celebrities, he was charged with calling for participation in the Civil Disobedience Movement (CDM) and damaging the state's ability to govern, with supporting the Committee Representing Pyidaungsu Hluttaw, and with generally inciting the people to disturb the peace and stability of the nation.

Filmography

Film (Cinema)
The Only Mom (လိပ်ပြာစံအိမ်) (2019)
Wind Up Dancer (လေဆန်ကကြိုး) (2019)
Legend of the Rain (ဒဏ္ဍာရီမိုး) (2019)
1014 (၁၀၁၄) (2019)
Confession of a Woman (မိန်းမတစ်ယောက်၏ ဖွင့်ဟဝန်ခံချက်) (2020)
Longing with Love (အချစ်ဖြင့်လွမ်းစေ) (2020)
Ayoke Kya Yar Say Sat Htin (အရုပ်ကျရာ ဆေးစက်ထင်) (TBA)
Mind away under the Moon (လရဲ့အောက်ဘက်မိုင်အဝေးမှာ) (TBA)
Wutt Lae Taw Shwe PaSoe Tann Htoe Loe Kyo Mal (ဝတ်လဲတော်ရွှေပုဆိုးတန်းထိုးလို့ကြိုမယ်) (TBA)
Surveillance Hnin Maung Vs Sanay Maung Maung (ဆားပုလဲနှင်းမောင်နှင့်စနေမောင်မောင် (TBA)
Love Equation (TBA)

Film

The Second Heart (ဒုတိယနှလုံးသား) (2016)
Father's School (အဖေ့ကျောင်း) (2016)
Little Umbrella Story (ထီးကလေးပုံပြင်) (2017)

Television series
Bagan Myo Thu (ပုဂံမြို့သူ) (2017)
Longing with Love (အချစ်ဖြင့်လွမ်းစေ) (2019)
From Chao Phraya to Irrawaddy (ကျောက်ဖရားမှဧရာဝတီသို့) (2022)

References

External links
 
 

Living people
Burmese male film actors
1990 births
21st-century Burmese male actors
People from Mandalay Region
Burmese footballers
Association football forwards
Southern Myanmar F.C. players